Robert Robertson was a Scottish footballer whose only club at the professional level was St Mirren, where he spent eleven seasons (all in the Scottish Football League's top division), making 296 appearances for the Buddies in the two major competitions and scoring 18 goals. His position was mainly as a centre half, although early in his career he was an inside forward before displacing the established 'pivot' Walter Bruce; he took part in the 1903 Glasgow Merchants Charity Cup final and the 1908 Scottish Cup Final, both of which St Mirren lost heavily to Celtic (5–2 and 5–1 respectively).

Robertson was selected once for the Scottish Football League XI against the Irish League XI in 1909.

References

19th-century births
Year of birth unknown
20th-century deaths
Year of death unknown
Scottish footballers
Association football central defenders
Scottish Junior Football Association players
St Mirren F.C. players
Scottish Football League players
Scottish Football League representative players
Renfrew Victoria F.C. players